Salamfone, a subsidiary of Kuwait’s Reach Telecom, was the world's first Syariah compliant mobile network. The Mobile Virtual Network Operator(MVNO) operated using the Maxis 2G network. 
Salamfone closed down its business on 1 August 2013.

Services and coverage
The prepaid starter pack was priced at RM8.50 with RM5 airtime. Voice calls are charged RM0.20/min(normal rate is 25sen/min) to all network nationwide & each SMS cost 10sen. Data is pay-per-use and it is charged 10sen/10kb.

Some of the services provided by Salamfone:

 Infaq-One sen will be donated by Salamfone every time a customer calls another Salamfone customer
 Talian Hidayah – dedicated Islamic helpline
 Islamic Auspicious Days reminder and bonus
 Free inspiring religious SMS
 Islamic tunes – Nasyid and Islamic RBT
 Subscription Islamic Value Added Services
 Reload transfer
    
Salamfone was planned to be aggressively marketed at Kedah, Perlis, Terengganu and Kelantan as these locations have the highest concentration of Muslim residents in Malaysia. The service will be primarily targeted to those in the age group of 17 to 55.

Developments
Salamfone, which received shariah certification in 2010, banned a number of things such as pornographic pictures sent and received through their lines.

SalamFone expected to be introduced in stages throughout Malaysia. Currently, they use 010 base 6XXX XXX.Salamfone also expected to introduce their 3G Internet service next month.

Termination
In late-July 2013, during the final weeks of the Ramadan holy month, and with Hari Raya Aidilfitri around the corner, Salamfone users begin to experience a series of service disruptions. It was later known that Salamfone is in the process of settling certain disputes with its host network Maxis.  After a series of disagreements between Salamfone and Maxis, it was later decided that Maxis will terminate Salamfone's services and hence, Salamfone was forcibly shut down.

On 1 August, Salamfone announced that it has officially shut down its services. Subscribers are asked to migrate to a different service provider. Existing Salamfone subscribers with unused credits could ask for a refund or bring their unused credits to XOX, another MVNO operator, and continue their services there.

References

External links
 

Defunct companies of Malaysia
Mobile phone companies of Malaysia
Internet service providers of Malaysia
Companies based in Kuala Lumpur
2013 disestablishments in Malaysia
Companies disestablished in 2013
Malaysian subsidiaries of foreign companies